"Love Won't Let Me Wait" is a hit 1975 single by Major Harris, a former member of R&B/soul group The Delfonics.  Written by Vinnie Barrett and Bobby Eli, the single is considered to be a staple of classic soul playlists, and was Harris' only entry into the top five on both the soul and pop charts.  The single hit number five on the pop chart, and also hit number one on the soul chart for one week. Billboard ranked it as the No. 24 song for 1975. 
It was awarded a gold disc by the R.I.A.A. on 25 June 1975.

Cover versions
Many artists have covered the song. Among the more notable renditions is one by jazz vocalist Nancy Wilson who performed the song in a 1994 episode of the Fox police drama television series New York Undercover. This version also appeared on her 1994 Columbia album, Love, Nancy.

Chart performance

Major Harris

Jackie Moore

Deniece Williams and Johnny Mathis

Nancy Wilson

References

External links
 

1975 singles
Nancy Wilson (jazz singer) songs
Ronnie Dyson songs
Johnny Mathis songs
Deniece Williams songs
Jackie Moore songs
Songs written by Vinnie Barrett
Songs written by Bobby Eli
1975 songs